Variovorax soli is a Gram-negative, catalase- and oxidase-positive, rod-shaped, non-spore-forming, motile bacterium from the genus Variovorax, which was isolated from greenhouse soil. Colonies of Variovorax soli are light yellow in color.

References

External links
Type strain of Variovorax soli at BacDive -  the Bacterial Diversity Metadatabase

Comamonadaceae
Bacteria described in 2006